Jamie Chambers (born January 25, 1975) is an American game designer who works primarily on role-playing games, contributing in a variety of genres. He served as Vice President of the non-profit Game Manufacturers Association, a trade association for the hobby games industry, from 2007 until 2016, when he chose not to seek re-election. He succeeded Marcus King for the post. Chambers worked with Margaret Weis at Sovereign Press in 1988, then transitioned with her to Margaret Weis Productions (MWP) where he served as Vice President and Lead Designer. While there, he created the Cortex System, a role-playing game ruleset that has been used by MWP since that time.

Career
Jamie Chambers contributed to the mythos of the world for Sovereign Stone through short stories, as well as by running the Sovereign Stone website. Margaret Weis and Don Perrin, along with Chambers and Christopher Coyle, wrote the licensed Dragonlance Campaign Setting (2003) for publication by Wizards of the Coast, and afterward Sovereign Press was allowed to expand and supplement that book using the d20 license. After Perrin left Sovereign Press and Weis created Margaret Weis Productions, the company's new direction kicked off with the Cortex System and the Serenity Role Playing Game (2005).

Through Margaret Weis Productions, Chambers also created and published the role playing games Battlestar Gallactica and Supernatural.  At the time, Serenity RPG was the most popular role playing game since the original Dungeons and Dragons, requiring four print runs in the first year of publishing.

Cortex System
Chambers created the Cortex System for the Serenity Role Playing Game during his time at Margaret Weis Productions. He then used it for additional licensed game supplements, several of which were based on television shows and movies, including Battlestar Galactica and Supernatural. The Cortex System shifted away from gameplay determined by the rules toward a gaming experience guided by them, which was considered a necessary step to counterbalance the computerization of role playing games. The system allows the game to evolve throughout a game session, providing the players with ways to create and modify the rules to meet their needs. The system was later adapted into Cortex Plus and Cortex "Prime" by Cam Banks when he took over for Chambers at Margaret Weis Productions as lead designer. Banks later founded Magic Vacuum, a production studio that has licensed the original Cortex System and the revised Cortex Plus, which is considered more narrative than the original Cortex system, building on the move away from systems constrained by rules and allowing further differentiation from computerized role playing games.

Awards and nominations
 2003 - Lucca Comics Games Awards Best Translated Game for Dragonlance 
 2005 - Origins Award Gamer's Choice Best Role Playing Game of the Year For Serenity
 2007 - I-CON Shared Worlds Award for his various supplements in the Firefly (TV series) and Serenity (2005 film) universe.
 2008 - Origins Award Finalist in the Role Playing Games Category for Battlestar Galactica RPG.

Bibliography
Roleplaying Supplements
 Sovereign Stone - Roleplaying books for the Sovereign Stone fiction novel world and the concepts and artwork of artist Larry Elmore.
Sovereign Stone Campaign Sourcebook. 2001. .
Bestiary of Loerem. 2002. .
Escape Into Darkness. 2002. .
Dragonlance - Roleplaying books for the popular Dragonlance fiction novel world and Tabletop role-playing game setting.
 -

Towers of High Sorcery. 2004. .

 Serenity/Firefly Universe - Roleplaying books tied into the Firefly (TV series), and associated Serenity (2005 film).
 
 
 Other Works

Sundered Reaches Campaign Setting. 2003. .
Battlestar Galactica Quickstart Guide. 2007. . OCLC 144523355.
 - Tie-in for the Battlestar Galactica (2004 TV series).
Cortex System Role Playing Game. 2008. . OCLC 294887717.

Short Fiction
 "At The Water's Edge," published in 
"Reflections," published in Vampyr Verse (collection). Popcorn Press. 2009. .
"The Ultharian," published in Cthulhu Haiku (and Other Mythos Madness). Popcorn Press. 2012. .
"Restless," published in Cthulhu Haiku 2 (and More Mythos Madness). Popcorn Press. 2013. .

Short Nonfiction

 "Growing Up Dragonlance," published in Dragons in the Archives: The Best of Weis & Hickman (anthology). 2004. . OCLC 56892788.
 "Blue Collar Ghost Hunters," published in In the Hunt : Unauthorized Essays on Supernatural (essay anthology). 2005. . OCLC 228365200.
 "Getting Out There: Tips For Creating Your Own Vocal Group," published in Filled With Glee: The Unauthorized Glee Companion. 2011. . OCLC 505420552.

References

External links
 Home page
 
 

1975 births
Living people
Role-playing game designers